This is a list of lighthouses in Turkmenistan faced on the Caspian Sea.

Lighthouses

See also
 Lists of lighthouses and lightvessels

References

External links
 

Turkmenistan
Lighthouses
Turkmenistan
Lighthouses